George Tofan ( – 15 July 1920) was a writer and official from Austro Hungary, the Moldavian Democratic Republic, and Romania. He was the editor in chief of Școala magazine (1907); also, George Tofan was a journalist and official in Chișinău.

Biography
He contributed to Junimea literară (1904), Viața Românească (1906), Patria, and Foaia poporului (1909). On 31 January 1909 he became the president of the Teacher Training Resource Centre "George Tofan". Also, he was the secretary of "Societatea pentru Cultura și Literatura Română în Bucovina". 

In 1914, Tofan was appointed as an inspector for the Romanian private schools and director of a school from Bazargic (today Dobrich). In 1917, together with Onisifor Ghibu, Tofan edited Școala Moldovenească in Chișinău; there he was a founder of the National Moldavian Party. On 6 November 1918 he was appointed as school inspector in Chișinău. In April 1919 Tofan was "Departamentul Instrucțiunii Publice din Bucovina" in Cernăuți, where he died a year later.

Honours 
 Teacher Training Resource Centre “George Tofan”, Suceava
 "George Tofan" Publishing House, Suceava

References

Works 
 "Avram Iancu, viața și activitatea lui", 1901

External links 
 George Tofan
 120 ani naștere George Tofan

1880 births
1920 deaths
People from Suceava County
Eastern Orthodox Christians from Romania
Romanian writers
Romanian schoolteachers
Austro-Hungarian emigrants to Romania
Ethnic Romanian politicians in Bukovina
Austro-Hungarian people of World War I
Austro-Hungarian journalists
Austro-Hungarian writers
20th-century journalists